Rudolph Borchert (March 27, 1928 – March 29, 2003) was an American screenwriter. He wrote the final episode of The Rockford Files, "Deadlock in Parma" with Donald L. Gold and Lester Wm. Berke.

Early life 
Borchert was born in Cleveland, Ohio. He served in the Korean War as the first lieutenant in a tank battalion. He received an Bronze Star Medal for rescuing one of his troops.

Career 
Borchert started his career in 1970, as co-authoring the children's book Bravo, Burro! with novelist, John Fante.

Borchert started his television career in 1974, as writing a few episodes for the short-lived television series Kolchak: The Night Stalker.

In 1975-1980s, Borchert wrote for shows, including, CHiPs, The Rockford Files, Quincy, M.E., Police Woman and Ellery Queen. He also screenplayed The Little Dragons.

In 1980s-1987, Borchert wrote six episodes of Scarecrow and Mrs. King''. He retired in 1987.

Death 
Borchert died in March 2003 after a long illness in Malibu, California, at the age of 75.

References

External links 

1928 births
2003 deaths
American screenwriters
People from Cleveland
American male screenwriters
American male television writers
American television writers
American writers
20th-century American screenwriters